Mira Oberholzer-Gincburg, (nee Mira Gincburg, 13 January 1884 - 12 December 1949), was a Swiss medical doctor and psychoanalyst of Russian-Polish origin. A pioneer of psychoanalysis in general and child psychology in particular, she was a founding member of the Swiss Society of Psychoanalysis in 1919 and worked in Switzerland and the United States of America as a child analyst.

Early life
Mira Gincburg was born on 13 January 1884 to Dr. Rafael Saveliev and Ravka Salmanowa Gordin, a Jewish couple, in Dinaburg, now in Latvia. Her father passed away when Gincburg was thirteen. She completed her schooling in Lodz, and moved to Bern in 1901, and then to Zurich in 1903, to pursue her medical studies.

Gincburg spent time in Russia in 1904-05 to appear for a teacher's examination. While there, she also participated in the failed 1905 Russian Revolution. She returned to Zurich, and resumed studying medicine at the University of Zurich in 1906. In September 1908, she submitted her thesis on the impact inorganic salts can have on the galvanic excitability of the nervous system. She earned her doctorate in 1909. Later that year, she travelled to St Petersburg to appear for, and passed, the Russian state examination.

Career
Gincburg, as a student of Carl Jung, engaged in analysis of children for some time at the Zurich psychiatric university hospital in 1909. She then moved to Riga to work at a sanatorium for the mentally ill before switching to Berlin in 1910 for further training. She was admitted into the Berlin Psychoanalytic Association in April 1911 as its first female member, and participated in the International Psychoanalytic Congress in Weimar.

Joining the Zurich wing of the International Psychoanalytic Association and the Association of Swiss Alien Doctors in 1911, Gincburg presented her analysis of a suicide attempt, contending that suicidal tendencies of a person suffering from schizophrenia might not result directly from the affliction itself but from the same factors involved in neurosis.

Gincburg married the psychiatrist Emil Oberholzer in 1913. They worked together at the Breitenau psychiatric centre in Schaffhausen as assistants to Hans Bertschinger. In 1915, they moved to Kusnacht to work with Theodore Brunner.

Oberholzer-Gincburg began a psychoanalytic clinic in Zurich with Emil Oberholzer after World War I ended. Following the ideological conflict between Jung and Sigmund Freud, the couple were among the founding members of the Swiss Society for Psychoanalysis (SSPsa) in 1919. She personally undertook analysis of her husband, and later referred him to Freud for further analysis. In 1923, she left their practice for some time to visit Freud for analysis in Vienna. She bore a son, Emil Hermann, in 1926. The couple left the SSPsa to create a new organization, the Swiss Medical Association for Psychoanalysis in 1928.

Rising anti-semitism in Switzerland prompted the Oberholzers to move to the United States in 1938, opening a psychoanalytic practice in New York City. They were among those who founded the Association for Psychoanalytic and Psychosomatic Medicine in 1942.

Mira Oberholzer-Gincburg died in New York City on 12 December 1949.

Published articles
Tolstoi über den Traum. Zentralblatt für Psychoanalyse 2, p. 615 (1911–12)
Mitteilung eines Kindheitstraumes. Internationale Zeitschrift für Psychoanalyse, 1-1, p. 79-80 (1913)
 Aus der Analyse eines 13-jährigen Mädchens. Schweizer Archiv für Neurologie und Psychiatrie 26, p. 287-292 (1930)

References

1884 births
Swiss women psychologists
Jewish psychologists
Child psychologists
20th-century psychologists
1949 deaths
Jewish women scientists
20th-century Latvian Jews
Scientists from Daugavpils
Emigrants from the Russian Empire to Switzerland
Swiss people of Russian-Jewish descent
20th-century Swiss women scientists
Swiss emigrants to the United States